Apriona swainsoni is a species of beetle in the family Cerambycidae. It was described by Hope in 1840. It is known from Myanmar, China, Laos, North Korea, South Korea, Vietnam, and Thailand. It feeds off of Caesalpinia decapetala.

Subspecies
 Apriona swainsoni basicornis Fairmaire, 1895
 Apriona swainsoni subteruniformis Breuning, 1954
 Apriona swainsoni swainsoni Hope, 1840

References

Batocerini
Beetles described in 1840
Beetles of Asia